Georges Chapouthier (born 27 March 1945 in Libourne) is a French neuroscientist and philosopher.

Biography
Georges Chapouthier is the son of Odette Mazaubert and Fernand Chapouthier (1899–1953). Fernand Chapouthier was a classicist and archeologist who was deputy director of the Ecole normale supérieure in Paris. Odette Mazaubert was known under the pseudonym of "Carquelin" for her Saintongeais writings. Chapouthier attended the Lycée Montaigne and the Lycée Louis-le-Grand in Paris. He then followed the "Classes Préparatoires aux Grandes Écoles" at the Lycée Saint-Louis and subsequently enrolled at the Ecole normale supérieure in 1964. Chapouthier then studied biology and philosophy, obtaining a "doctorat d'état" in both (University of Strasbourg, 1973, and Jean Moulin University Lyon 3, 1986, respectively).

During his whole career, Chapouthier has worked for the French National Centre for Scientific Research (CNRS), where he currently has the rank of emeritus research director. His research focuses on the pharmacology of memory and anxiety and on philosophy, especially the relations between humans and animals.

As a philosopher, he was influenced by Louis Bourgey and François Dagognet.

Publications

Books
 Psychophysiologie - Le système nerveux et le Comportement, G. Chapouthier, M. Kreutzer, C. Menini, Editions Etudes vivantes, Paris, 1980, 192 pp.
 L'inné et l'acquis des structures biologiques, J.J. Matras and G. Chapouthier (eds.), collection "Le Biologiste", Presses Universitaires de France, Paris, 1981, 243 pp, .
 Introduction au fonctionnement du système nerveux (codage et traitement de l'information), G. Chapouthier, J.J. Matras, Editions MEDSI, Paris, 1982, 224 pp, .
 Mémoire et Cerveau - Biologie de l'apprentissage, G. Chapouthier, Collection Science et DEcouvertes, Editions du Rocher, Monaco, 1988, 126 pp, .
 Au bon vouloir de l'homme, l'animal, G. Chapouthier, Editions Denoël, Paris,1990, 260 pp, .
 Les droits de l'animal, G. Chapouthier, Collection "Que sais-je ?", Presses Universitaires de France, Paris, 1992, 125 pp, .(Czech edition : Triton, Prague, 2013, 120 pp).
 La biologie de la mémoire, G. Chapouthier, Collection "Que sais-je ?", Presses Universitaires de France, Paris, 1994, 125 pp, .
 Les droits de l'animal aujourd'hui, G. Chapouthier, J.C. Nouët (eds.), Collection "Panoramiques", Editions Arléa-Corlet (Diffusion Le Seuil) and Ligue Française des Droits de l'Animal, Paris, 1997, 244 pp; .
 The Universal Declaration of Animal Rights - Comments and Intentions, G. Chapouthier, J.C. Nouët (eds.), Editions Ligue Française des Droits de l'Animal, Paris, 1998, 92 pp; .
 L'homme, ce singe en mosaïque, G. Chapouthier, Editions Odile Jacob, Paris, 2001, 211 pp, .
 Qu'est-ce que l'animal?, G. Chapouthier, Collection "Les petites pommes du savoir", Editions le Pommier, Paris, 2004, 55 pp, . (Korean edition: Editions Goldenbough, Seoul, South Korea, 2005, 64 pp; Spanish edition:¿Qué es el animal? Tres Cantos, Madrid, 2006, 56 pp).
 Biologie de la mémoire, G. Chapouthier, Editions Odile Jacob, Paris, 2006, 222 pp, .
 L'être humain, l'animal et la technique, M.-H. Parizeau and G. Chapouthier (eds.), Les Presses de l'Université Laval, Quebec, Canada, 2007, 241 pp, .
 Plasticity and anxiety, P. Venault and G. Chapouthier (eds.), Hindawi, New York, 2007, .
 La cognition réparée? Perturbations et récupérations des fonctions cognitives, R. Jouvent and G. Chapouthier (eds.), Editions de la Maison des sciences de l'homme, Paris, 2008, 220 pp, .
 Kant et le chimpanzé - Essai sur l'être humain, la morale et l'art, G. Chapouthier, Editions Belin, Paris, 2009, 144 pp, .(Spanish edition: Kant y el chimpancé, Proteus, Espana, 2011,148 pp); Serbian edition: Kant i simpanza, Dereta, Serbia, 2012,154 pp)   
 La création –définitions et défis contemporains, S. Dallet, G. Chapouthier, and E. Noël (eds.), Editions L'Harmattan, 2009, 243 pp, .
 O faut bin rigoler in p'tit! (in Saintongeais), G. Chapouthier, Editions des régionalismes, Monein (France), 2010, 70 pp, .
L'homme, l'animal et la machine - Perpétuelles redéfinitions, G.Chapouthier, F.Kaplan, CNRS Editions, Paris, 2011, 220 pp, 
La question animale – Entre science, littérature et philosophie, J.P. Engélibert, L. Campos, C. Coquio, G. Chapouthier (editors), Presses Universitaires de Rennes – Espace Mendès France Poitiers, 2011, 307 pp, 
 Que reste-t-il du propre de l'homme ? G. Chapouthier, J.G. Ganascia, L. Naccache, P. Picq, Les Presses de l'ENSTA, Palaiseau (France), 2012, 78 pp, 
 Le chercheur et la souris, G.Chapouthier, F.Tristani-Potteaux, CNRS Éditions, Paris, 2013, 208 pp, .
 Mondes mosaïques – Astres, villes, vivant et robots, J. Audouze, G. Chapouthier, D. Laming, P.Y. Oudeyer, CNRS Editions, 2015, 214 pp, 
 L'invention de la mémoire, Ecrire, Enregistrer, Numériser, Michel Laguës, Denis Beaudouin, Georges Chapouthier, CNRS Editions, 2017, 384 pp, 
 The Mosaic Theory of Natural Complexity: A scientific and philosophical approach [online], G. Chapouthier, Éditions des maisons des sciences de l'homme associées, La Plaine-Saint-Denis (France), Available on the Internet: <https://books.openedition.org/emsha/200>

Selected articles
 Chapouthier G. (1983), Protein synthesis and memory, in: J.A. Deutsch (Editor), Physiological Basis of Memory, 2nd Edition, Academic Press, New York, Chapter l, pp. 1–47
 
 
 
 
 
 Chapouthier G., Venault P. (2004), GABA-A Receptor Complex and Memory Processes, Medicin. Chemistry Reviews online, 1, 91-99
 Chapouthier G. (2004), To what extent is moral judgement natural ?, Eur. Review (GB), 12(2), 179-183
 Venault P., Chapouthier G. (2007), From the Behavioral Pharmacology of Beta-Carbolines to Seizures, Anxiety and Memory, TheScientificWorldJournal, 7, 204-223, on line (www.thescientificworld.com)
 Chapouthier G. (2009), Mosaic structures – a working hypothesis for the complexity of living organisms, E-Logos (Electronic Journal for Philosophy), University of Economics, Prague, 17, http://nb.vse.cz/kfil/elogos/biocosmology/chapouthier09.pdf 
 Viaud-Delmon I., Venault P., Chapouthier G. (2011), Behavioral models for anxiety and multisensory integration in  animals and humans, Progress in Neuro-Psychopharmacology & Biological Psychiatry,35, 1391–1399, on line, http://www.elsevier.com/wps/find/journaldescription.cws_home/525488/description#description
 Chapouthier G. (2012), Mosaic structures in living beings in the light of several modern stances, Biocosmology- Neo-Aristotelism, 2(1-2), 6-14, on line, http://en.biocosmology.ru/electronic-journal-biocosmology---neo-aristotelism 
 Chapouthier G. (2014) Animal Rights, Encyclopedia of Global Bioethics (online) DOI 10.1007/978-3-319-05544-2_22-1, Springer Science+Business Media Dordrecht

References

External links
 Faculty page at the University of Paris 1 Pantheon-Sorbonne
 Faculty page at the Institut d'Histoire et de Philosophie des Sciences et des Techniques

French neuroscientists
20th-century French philosophers
20th-century French writers
20th-century French biologists
21st-century French philosophers
21st-century French scientists
21st-century French writers
21st-century biologists
1945 births
People from Libourne
Living people
École Normale Supérieure alumni
Lycée Saint-Louis alumni
Lycée Louis-le-Grand alumni
French National Centre for Scientific Research scientists
French male non-fiction writers
Research directors of the French National Centre for Scientific Research